The 2014–15 Texas Longhorns men's basketball team represented the University of Texas at Austin in the 2014–15 NCAA Division I men's basketball season. Their head coach was Rick Barnes, who was in his 17th year as head coach. The team played their home games at the Frank Erwin Center in Austin, Texas and were members of the Big 12 Conference. They finished the season 20–14, 8–10 in Big 12 play to finish in a three-way tie for sixth place. They lost in the quarterfinals of the Big 12 tournament to Iowa State. They received an at-large bid to the NCAA tournament where they lost in the second round to Butler.

Previous season
They finished the season 24–11, 11–7 in Big 12 play to finish in a tie for third place. They advanced to the semifinals of the Big 12 tournament where they lost to Baylor. They received an at-large bid to the NCAA tournament where they defeated Arizona State in the second round before losing in the third round to Michigan.

Before the season

Departures

Recruiting

Roster
=

Schedule
Source:

|-
!colspan=9 style="background:#CC5500; color:white;"| Non-conference regular season

|-
!colspan=9 style="background:#CC5500; color:white;"| Big 12 Conference season

|-
!colspan=9 style="background:#CC5500; color:white;"| Big 12 tournament

|-

|-
!colspan=9 style="background:#CC5500; color:white;"| NCAA tournament

Rankings

See also
2014–15 Texas Longhorns women's basketball team

References

Texas
Texas Longhorns men's basketball seasons
Texas
2014 in sports in Texas
2015 in sports in Texas